Francisco Herrera León (born 16 September 1966) is a Mexican politician affiliated with the PRI. As of 2013 he served as Senator of the LX and LXI Legislatures of the Mexican Congress representing Tabasco. He also served as Deputy during the LIX Legislature.

References

1966 births
Living people
Politicians from Tabasco
Members of the Senate of the Republic (Mexico)
Members of the Chamber of Deputies (Mexico)
Institutional Revolutionary Party politicians
21st-century Mexican politicians